Power moves are dance moves which are loosely defined as moves relying on speed, momentum, and acrobatic elements for performance. They are prominent in B-boying, often the centerpieces of routines featuring the other elements (toprock, downrock, and freezes) that make up breaking. Power moves are closer to gymnastics than dancing. B-boys who focus heavily on power moves and execute them as a main part of their routines are often called "power heads".

Origin

B-boy Powerful PEX and the New York City Breakers were credited in 1983 for the B-boy style of combining 2 or 3 difficult moves together. This includes floats, Headmills aka Power windmills, and flares suicides. In the 1990s the B-boys shortened the phrase "powerful moves" down to "power moves" in the 1990s to make it sound more flashy. New generations of B-boys are executing more acrobatics, which is taking moves to the next level.

Types

Spins

Back spin: One of the first and most famous spinning power moves, the dancer is balled up and spinning on his or her back. In some variations, the dancer may choose to hop while spinning.
Shoulder spin
Air chair spin
Zulu spin
The headspin is an athletic move in which a person spins on their head from a headstand position. These may be done continuously through hand-tapping and proper balance.

Handstand moves
The 1990 is a breakdance move which resembles a rapidly spinning one-handed handstand. Created Spinner of the Dynamic Rockers referred to as a "Hand Spin"* 2000s are similar to 1990s, but with both hands.
Airflare is a breakdance move that requires the dancer to revolve hand to hand while keeping their legs in the air in a V-Formation.

Floats
Floats were one of the first power moves in the 1980s. The body is usually in a fixed position while the arms move.
Crickets and variants: Hydro, Jackhammer, Lotus Jackhammer, Super Jackhammer, Darkhammer, Hopping Turtles/Scratching Turtles, etc.
UFO, Boomerangs, Inside Boomerangs, Gorillas, Gremlin Spins/Buddha spins etc

Swipes
Swipes are one of the most recognizable power moves. The b-boy or b-girl leans back, whips his or her arms to one side to touch the ground, and his or her legs follow closely behind, twisting 360 degrees to land on the ground once again.
A variant is the master swipe, also known as a superman swipe or one-footed swipe
Shadow Swipes is a variation of the swipe that incorporates the chair freeze to start the swipe. Created by Bboy Kid Shade of Hong Kong, it is one of his signature moves.

Windmills
The headmill is a windmill variant performed without the use of hands for stability, rotating with the head and shoulders as the pivot point. As headmills free the hands, there are many further variations defined by the positioning of the hands.

Major windmill variants:
Mummies/Coffin
Nutcrackers
Eggbeaters
HandCuffs
Bellymills/superman
Confusions
Barrels/headmills
Forearms
Airplane/Highrisers/Highrises
Munchmills/Babymills
Tombstone

Flares
Flares are a widely recognized power move borrowed from gymnastics.
Major variants:

King Flares/Hopping Flare
Crossed-legged Flare
Chair Flare
Double Chair Flare
Sandwich Flare
Lotus Flare
Thread Flare
One-legged Flare
Virgin/Double Leg Circles - flares done with closed, straight legs
Tomas Flare

References

See also

Breakdance moves